Lapping Memorial Park is a park located in the town of Clarksville, Indiana. The park is a  park that features play grounds, a Disc Golf course, softball fields, golf, tennis courts, basketball courts, volleyball space, horseshoe pits, amphitheater, lodge, shelter house, and three hiking trails immersed in a thick wooded scene.

Woodland and wildlife
The western part of the park runs along the banks of Silver Creek. The Knob and Valley Audubon Society (KAVAS) conducted a survey of birds in 1970 in which about 45 species were found to be inhabitants and visitors to the park including species of wood warbler, flycatchers, blue heron and woodpecker birds. Other wild life include deer, beaver, foxes, squirrels, owls, opossum, and raccoons.

External links
Clarksville Parks

References

Clarksville, Indiana
Parks in Indiana
Protected areas of Clark County, Indiana